This article lists the members of the People's Representative Council from 1999 to 2004. The 15th People's Representative Council follows the 1999 Indonesian legislative election held on 7 June 1999. There are 462 elected MPs and 38 appointed MPs in the Parliament.

Speaker and Deputy Speaker

Elected

Aceh 

Key:

North Sumatra

West Sumatra

Bengkulu

Jambi

Riau

West Java

Jakarta 

Pengganti

Central Java 

Pengganti

Yogyakarta

South Kalimantan 

Pengganti

West Kalimantan

East Kalimantan

Central Kalimantan

North Sulawesi

Central Sulawesi

Southeast Sulawesi

South Sulawesi

Bali

West Nusa Tenggara

East Nusa Tenggara 

Pengganti

East Timor

Maluku

Irian Jaya

Appointed

References 
 Anggota Dewan Perwakilan Rakyat Republik Indonesia Periode 1999-2004

Lists of members of the People's Representative Council